Vittorio Staccione (9 April 1904 – 16 March 1945) was an Italian professional footballer who played as a midfielder.

Early and personal life
Staccione was born in Turin; his younger brother, Eugenio was also a professional footballer. His wife, Giulia, died in 1930 following the complications from the delivery of a stillborn child.

Career
In his youth, Mazzoni played for Torino.

In his senior career, Staccione played for Torino (1924–1927), Cremonese (on loan from Torino during the 1924–25 season), Fiorentina (1927–1931), Cosenza (1931–1934), and Savoia (1934–1935).

During his time at Torino, he contributed to winning the 1926–27 Divisione Nazionale which was later stripped following allegations of bribery.

Later life and death
After retiring from football, Staccione worked as a labourer for Fiat.

Staccione was a noted anti-fascist. During his time at Savoia, he was regularly accosted by fascist personnel. He was arrested by the SS in March 1944 and died at the Mauthausen-Gusen concentration camp in March 1945.

In 2012, he was inducted into ACF Fiorentina Hall of Fame.

References

1904 births
1945 deaths
Italian footballers
Serie B players
Torino F.C. players
U.S. Cremonese players
ACF Fiorentina players
Cosenza Calcio players
Association football midfielders
Italian people who died in Mauthausen concentration camp
Italian anti-fascists